Cynthia Anita Louise Astwood   (born 9 October 1946) served as the acting Governor of the Turks and Caicos from 26 November until 16 December 2002, when she retired and was succeeded by Jim Poston. She was the first woman to act as Governor of the Turks and Caicos.

References

1946 births
Living people
Governors of the Turks and Caicos Islands
Turks and Caicos Islands women in politics
Officers of the Order of the British Empire
20th-century British women politicians
21st-century British women politicians